Coleophora basimaculella is a moth of the family Coleophoridae. It is found in south-eastern Europe and Asia Minor.

The length of the forewings is 5.5-7.5 mm for males and 4–5 mm for females. Adults are on wing in April and May.

References

basimaculella
Moths described in 1864
Moths of Europe
Moths of Asia